Banc du Geyser (also Banc du Geysir) is a mostly submerged reef in the Mozambique Channel's northeastern part,  northeast from Mayotte,  southwest of the Glorioso Islands, and  off the northwestern coast of Madagascar.

Description

In the eastern part of the reef there are some sandy cays,  in height covered with grass and small bushes. The entrance into the central lagoon is possible from a south-southeastern direction. There is an abundance of seabirds, and the cays are covered in tons of guano.

History
The Geysir Reef was first known by Arab sailors around the year 700, and was shown on some navigation-charts dated around 800. Around 1650 the reef was shown on Spanish maps as Arecife de Santo Antonio. The current name was given on 23 December 1678, when a British vessel, Geysir, ran on the reef.

France and the Comoros claim the Banc du Geyser as part of their exclusive economic zone (EEZ). The reef is also claimed by Madagascar. From the French point of view, it is a part of the EEZ of Glorioso Islands, one of their Scattered Islands in the Indian Ocean. Madagascar announced its annexation in 1976, presumably because of the possibility of oil fields in the vicinity but the Banc du Geyser is controlled in fact by the French forces armées de la zone sud de l'océan Indien.

In 2012, France included the reef in the parc naturel marin des Glorieuses, a marine protected area, to preserve the endangered flora and fauna of the Glorioso Islands.

External links

Sailing Directions: East Africa and the South Indian Ocean. Accessed 30 September 2022.

Disputed waters
Reefs of France
Territorial disputes of France
Territorial disputes of Madagascar
Territorial disputes of the Comoros
Reefs of the Indian Ocean
Landforms of Madagascar
Landforms of the Comoros
Comoros–Madagascar relations
France–Madagascar relations
Comoros–France relations
Islands of Africa